Fort Pownall was a British fortification built during the French and Indian War, whose remains are located at Fort Point State Park in Stockton Springs, Maine. The fort was named for Governor Thomas Pownall, who oversaw its construction. It never saw action, and was destroyed during the American Revolutionary War by the actions of both colonists and the British military to prevent its further use. The fort's remains were listed on the National Register of Historic Places in 1969.

Setting

Fort Point State Park is located at the easternmost tip of Cape Jellison, a triangular peninsula which juts into Penobscot Bay at the mouth of the Penobscot River.  The  park, established in 1974, includes, in addition to the ruins of Fort Pownall, the Fort Point Light. The cape's eastern tip forms a narrow peninsula, with the fort's ruins on the high ground near its easternmost end.

History
In 1759, during the French and Indian War, Massachusetts governor Thomas Pownall led the construction of a fort here, which he named Fort Pownall after himself. It was one of three significant forts which the British built on the major rivers in the Northeast to cut off the native water ways to the ocean to prevent Indian attacks on the Thirteen Colonies (see also Fort Halifax and Fort Frederick). The fort was also intended by Pownall to reduce France's presence in North America, since "for as long as any Indian has any claim to [the region surrounding the fort], the French will maintain a title to them." The first commander of the fort was Jedidiah Preble (1759-1763), followed by Col. Thomas Goldthwait (1763-1775). In 1775, British forces seized the cannons and powder during the American Revolution. Later, a regiment of Continental Army soldiers burnt the blockhouse and filled in most of the ditches to prevent their use by the British.

Description
Because the blockhouse and other wooden elements of the fort were burned, only the earthworks and stone foundations remain.

See also 
National Register of Historic Places listings in Waldo County, Maine

References

External links 

Fort Point State Park Department of Agriculture, Conservation and Forestry 
Fort Point State Historic Site Brochure Department of Agriculture, Conservation and Forestry

Buildings and structures in Waldo County, Maine
Pownall
Pownall
National Register of Historic Places in Waldo County, Maine